Salvia subincisa, the sawtooth sage or sharptooth sage, is a small erect Salvia species that is native to New Mexico, Arizona, and Texas in the United States, and the Baja California peninsula, Chihuahua, and Sonora in Mexico. It is typically found growing in sandy areas near roadsides or other arid parts of the American southwest. It is very often associated with Pueblo ruins in New Mexico, along with Cleome serrulata and Lithospermum caroliniense.

Salvia subincisa has deep purple flowers with white markings inside, above small opposite leaves. It is similar, though smaller, than Salvia reflexa.

References

External links
 IPNI Listing
 JSTOR Plant Science Type Specimen
 USDA Plant Profile
 Kew Plant List

subincisa

Flora of Arizona
Flora of Baja California
Flora of Baja California Sur
Flora of Chihuahua (state)
Flora of New Mexico
Flora of Texas